The Dutch Eerste Divisie in the 1982–83 season was contested by 16 teams, two less than the previous season. This was due to the disbandment of FC Amsterdam at the end of last season and the disbandment of SC Amersfoort halfway this year. DS '79 won the championship.

New entrants
Relegated from the 1981–82 Eredivisie
 FC Den Haag
 De Graafschap
 MVV Maastricht

League standings

Promotion competition
In the promotion competition, four period winners (the best teams during each of the four quarters of the regular competition) played for promotion to the Eredivisie.

See also
 1982–83 Eredivisie
 1982–83 KNVB Cup

References
Netherlands - List of final tables (RSSSF)

Eerste Divisie seasons
2
Neth